Camino is a village in the municipality of Oderzo, in the province of Treviso, region Veneto, in Italy. 

History
Venetic period
The earliest settlement of the area can be dated to the Iron Age, around the 10th century BC.  
From the mid-9th century BC the Veneti occupied site and gave it its name.  Etymologically, "-terg-" in Opitergium stems from a Venetic root word indicating a market (q.v. Tergeste, the old name of Trieste).  The location of Oderzo on the Venetian plain made it ideal as a centre for trade.

10th century AD
In the 10th century a certain Guido Colalto became count of Montanara for having saved the life of the German king Conrad I. His sons Alberto and Guecello received further lands from bishop of Ceneda, in the plain between the Piave and Livenza, in particular in Camino, where they built a castle. From the name of the place, they took their future name and became the da Camino Family.

Notable people
 Stefano Dall'Acqua – Italian footballer who plays for Reggiana.

References

Notes

External links 
 
 Tourism website
 Map of Veneto

Cities and towns in Veneto